Alexandra Tomasi, Princess of Lampedusa (née Alexandra von Wolff-Stomersee) (13 November 1894 in Nice - 22 June 1982 in Palermo) was an Italian and Baltic German psychoanalyst. She was the daughter of Italian mezzo-soprano and violinist Alice Barbi (1858-1948) and Baron Boris von Wolf-Stomersee (1850–1917). She was instrumental in the reorganisation of the Italian psychoanalytic society (SPI) after World War II and was the president of the SPI from 1954 to 1959. In 1932 she married Giuseppe Tomasi di Lampedusa the author of The Leopard (as her second husband).

References

1894 births
1982 deaths
Baltic nobility
Baltic-German people
German psychoanalysts
Italian psychoanalysts
Tomasi di Lampedusa family